The Arizona Supreme Court is the state supreme court of the U.S. state of Arizona. Sitting in the Supreme Court building in downtown Phoenix, the court consists of a chief justice, a vice chief justice, and five associate justices. Each justice is appointed by the governor of Arizona from a list recommended by a bipartisan commission. Justices stand for retention in an election two years after their appointment and then every six years. They must retire at age 70.

Court history
The court started in 1912 with 3 justices. Alfred Franklin, Donald L. Cunningham, and Henry D. Ross took office on February 14, 1912. In 1949, the Court expanded from 3 to 5 justices and from 5 to 7 justices in 2016.

The jurisdiction of the court is prescribed by Article VI, Section 5 of the Arizona Constitution. Most of the appeals heard by the court go through the Arizona Court of Appeals, except for death penalty cases, over which the Arizona Supreme Court has sole appellate jurisdiction. The court also has original jurisdiction in a few other circumstances as outlined in the Arizona Constitution. A quorum is three, but the whole court must sit in order to declare a law unconstitutional.

Selection of justices

The Chief Justice is chosen for a five-year term by the court, and is eligible for re-election. They supervise the administration of all the inferior courts. They are Chairman of the Commission on Appellate Court Appointments, which nominates candidates to fill vacancies in the appellate courts. If the Governor fails to appoint one of the nominated candidates within sixty days of their names being submitted to her or him, the Chief Justice makes the appointment.

The Vice Chief Justice, who acts as Chief Justice in the latter's "absence or incapacity," is chosen by the court for a term determined by the court.

Justices are selected by a modified form of the Missouri Plan.  A bipartisan commission considers applicants and sends a list of nominees to the governor.  The governor is required by law to appoint from this list based on merit, without regard to party affiliation.  Justices are then retained for an initial period, after which they are subject to a retention election.   If the justice wins the election, his/her term is six years.

Qualifications
Admitted to the practice of law in Arizona and be a resident of Arizona for the 10 years before taking office;
May not practice law while a member of the judiciary;
May not hold any other political office or public employment;
May not hold office in any political party;
May not campaign, except for him/herself; and, 
Must retire at age 70.

Justices

The current Arizona Supreme Court includes:

Chief Justices

 Alfred Franklin (1912–1914, 1917)
 Henry D. Ross (1915–1916, 1921–1922, 1927–1928, 1933–1934, 1939–1940, 1945) 
 Donald L. Cunningham (1918–1920)
 Archibald G. McAlister (1923–1926, 1931–1932, 1937–1938, 1943–1944)
 Alfred C. Lockwood (1929–1930, 1935–1936, 1941–1942)
 Rawghlie Clement Stanford (1945–1948)
 Arthur T. LaPrade (1949–1950, 1955–1956)
 Levi Stewart Udall (1951–1952)
 Rawghlie Clement Stanford (1953–1953)
 Marlin T. Phelps (1954–1954, 1959)
 Levi Stewart Udall (1957–1958)
 Fred C. Struckmeyer Jr. (1960–1961, 1966, 1971, 1980–1981)
 Charles C. Bernstein (1962–1963, 1967–1967)
 Jesse Addison Udall (1964–1964, 1969) 
 Lorna E. Lockwood (1965–1965, 1970) (First female chief justice in the United States)
 Ernest McFarland (1968–1968)
 Jack D. H. Hays (1972–1974)
 James Duke Cameron (1975–1979)
 William A. Holohan (1982–1987)
 Frank Gordon Jr. (1987–1992)
 Stanley G. Feldman (1992–1997)
 Thomas A. Zlaket (1997–2002)
 Charles E. Jones (2002–2005)
 Ruth McGregor (2005–2009)
 Rebecca White Berch (2009–2014)
 Scott Bales (2014–2019)
 Robert M. Brutinel (2019–present)

Notable cases
 Harrison v. Laveen, 67 Ariz. 337, 196 P.2d 456 (1948), a case in which the Court held that the state constitution's use of the phrase "persons under guardianship" applied only to judicial guardianship and had "no application to the plaintiffs or to the Federal status of Indians in Arizona as a class."
 Spur Industries, Inc. v. Del E. Webb Development Co., 108 Ariz. 178, 494 P.2d 700 (1972), a case addressing the principles of nuisance law.

See also

 Arizona Bar Exam
 Courts of Arizona

References

External links
Map: 
 Arizona Supreme Court Justices
 Arizona Constitution, Article VI
 Arizona Judicial Branch

 
Arizona
1912 establishments in Arizona
Courts and tribunals established in 1912